Arthur Read is a character in the animated TV series Arthur.

Arthur Read may also refer to:

Arthur Read (footballer, born 1894) (1894–?), English footballer
Arthur Read (footballer, born 1999), English footballer
Arthur Read (rugby league), see 1946 New Zealand rugby league season

See also
Arthur Reade (1902–1971), British labour movement activist
Arthur Reed (disambiguation)
Arthur Reid (disambiguation)